Snøbjørga Bluff is a rock and ice bluff at the east side of the head of Stuttflog Glacier, in the Mühlig-Hofmann Mountains of Queen Maud Land. It was mapped by Norwegian cartographers from surveys and air photos by the Norwegian Antarctic Expedition (1956–60) and named Snøbjørga ("the snow mountain").

References

Cliffs of Queen Maud Land
Princess Martha Coast